Macrurocampa is a genus of moths of the family Notodontidae erected by Harrison Gray Dyar Jr. in 1893. They are found primarily in North America.

Species
These nine species belong to the genus Macrurocampa:
 Macrurocampa alpina (Benjamin, 1932)
 Macrurocampa dolorosa (Schaus, 1911)
 Macrurocampa dorothea Dyar, 1896
 Macrurocampa frisoni (Barnes & Benjamin, 1927)
 Macrurocampa gigantea (Barnes & Benjamin, 1924)
 Macrurocampa marthesia (Cramer, 1780) (mottled prominent)
 Macrurocampa miranda Dyar, 1905
 Macrurocampa ruficornis Dyar, 1905
 Macrurocampa zayasi (Torre & Alayo, 1959) (blue moor-grass moth)

References

External links

 

Notodontidae